The Bosnia and Herzegovina football champions (Championship: Prvenstvo, single: "Prvaci", plural: Prvaci) are the annual winners of Premier League, Bosnia and Herzegovina's premier annual football league competition. The title has been contested since 1923 in varying forms of competition.

History
In 1923 it was organised the first edition of leagues in the Kingdom of Yugoslavia where, beside the top-level national Yugoslav Football Championship, regional championships were also played. The clubs of the Drina Banovina, part of Littoral Banovina and Vrbas Banovina, territorially similar to present day Bosnia and Herzegovina, played within the Sarajevo Football Subassociation League until 1939. The champions of Subassociation Leagues were granted a place in the qualifiers to the Yugoslav Championship, a top national level. SAŠK (1923, 1924, 1925, 1926, 1927, 1928, 1930/31), Slavija (1929, 1930, 1932/33, 1934/35, 1935/36, 1936/37, 1937/38, 1938/39, 1939/40), FK Krajišnik Banja Luka (1935/36) were the clubs to manage to participate in the national league, first in 1923 when the championship was played in a cup system. In 1939 the Yugoslav league system was changed, with the creation of separate Serbian and Croato-Slovenian Leagues which will serve as qualifying leagues for the final phase of the Yugoslav Championship.  The clubs from the Sarajevo Subassociation played their qualifications to the Serbian League, however Slavija Sarajevo managed to participate, in 1939–40 (3rd place) and 1940–41 (9th place) and played their qualifications to the Croatian-Slovenian League, however SAŠK managed to participate, and it did it in both occasions, in 1939–40 (5th place) and 1940–41 (5th place). That became the last season before the beginning of the Second World War.

Royal League
The clubs from the territory of Drina Banovina, part of Littoral Banovina and Vrbas Banovina (belonging to the Kingdom of Yugoslavia) had a league organised by the Sarajevo Football Subassociation.  The winner had direct access to the Yugoslav Championship.

As part of Croatia (WWII)
Source:

Regional League
During this period Bosnia and Herzegovina was part of SFR Yugoslavia and its leading clubs (including FK Sarajevo (43 seasons, title: 1966/67, 1984/85), FK Željezničar (34 seasons, title: 1971/72), FK Velež Mostar (38 seasons), FK Sloboda Tuzla (25 seasons), NK Čelik Zenica (17 seasons) and FK Borac Banja Luka (14 seasons), FK Slavija (11 seasons)) played in the Yugoslav leagues.

National Competitions

War in Bosnia and Herzegovina
After a breakup of Yugoslavia Bosnia and Herzegovina proclaimed independence in late winter 1992, and already in April same year N/FSBiH applied for membership with FIFA and UEFA. Meanwhile, due to the outbreak of Bosnian War in April 1992 no games were played in the 1992–93 season. In late 1993 some parts of the country re-launched football competitions with reduced scope. But just as the country was divided along ethnic lines, so was football.

In 1993 Bosnian Croats launched  the Football Federation of Herzeg Bosnia and its First League of Herzeg-Bosnia, in which only Croatian clubs competed on parochial scale within the limits of West Herzegovina and few other enclaves. In the same year Bosnian Serbs also organized their own First League of the Republika Srpska, on a territory held by Republika Srpska regime at the time.
Only football on a territory under the control of then Republic of Bosnia and Herzegovina institutions and auspices of N/FSBiH, at the time consequently with Bosniak majority, apart from a brief competition for the season 1994–95 (won by Čelik Zenica), came to a standstill. 
Competition under auspices of N/FSBiH did not resume until 1995–96 season when the First League of Bosnia and Herzegovina was launched.

Bosnia and Herzegovina Champions
Champions of First League of Bosnia and Herzegovina 
 1994–95 - Čelik - "Champion of BiH"
 1995–96 - Čelik - "Champion of BiH"
 1996–97 - Čelik - "Champion of BiH"
 1997–98 - Bosna Visoko - "Champion of First League of Bosnia and Herzegovina"
 1998–99 - FK Sarajevo - "Champion of BiH"
 1999–00 - Jedinstvo Bihać - "Champion of First League of Bosnia and Herzegovina"

Champions of First League of Herzeg-Bosnia
 1993–94 - Široki Brijeg – Mario Prskalo (10 goals, Široki Brijeg)
 1994–95 - Široki Brijeg – Anđelko Marušić (15, Široki Brijeg)
 1995–96 - Široki Brijeg – Mario Marušić (15, Grude), Dejan Džepina (15, Novi Travnik)
 1996–97 - Široki Brijeg – Anđelko Marušić (21, Široki Brijeg)
 1997–98 - Široki Brijeg – Stanko Bubalo (31, Široki Brijeg)
 1998–99 - Posušje – Slađan Filipović (19, Široki Brijeg)
 1999–00 - Posušje – Robert Ristovski (18, Kiseljak)

Champions of First League of the Republika Srpska

Champions of Bosnia and Herzegovina
Listing seasons (aside of 1998–99 season) before the creation of Premier League of Bosnia and Herzegovina where the champion was decided via a play-off played between best placed clubs who played in First League of Bosnia and Herzegovina and First League of Herzeg-Bosnia (without clubs from First League of the Republika Srpska).

1 A play-off between the best placed teams of First League of Bosnia and Herzegovina and First League of Herzeg-Bosnia was played; without clubs from First League of Republika Srpska. The best two clubs got the right to play in 1998–99 UEFA Cup.
2 Play-off was scheduled but was later canceled because of stadium issues. Three different leagues played, no play-off contested, therefore no club got the right to play in European competition.
3 A play-off between the best placed teams of First League of Bosnia and Herzegovina and First League of Herzeg-Bosnia was played without clubs from First League of Republika Srpska. Three clubs got the right to play in European competition.

Premier League Champions
Since 2000/2001 season the first tier of Bosnia and Herzegovina football competition became Premier League of Bosnia and Herzegovina.

1 Played without clubs from Republika Srpska entity of BiH which only joined the league since 2002.

by titles
Counting since when the Premier League of Bosnia and Herzegovina is played and recognized by UEFA, season 2000-01

by cities
The following table lists the champions by cities; Counting since when the Premier League of Bosnia and Herzegovina is played and recognized by UEFA, season 2000-01

References

External links
Football Federation of Bosnia and Herzegovina Official Site 
League at UEFA 

 

Bosnia and Herzegovina